The 2018 Ford EcoBoost 200 was the 23rd and final stock car race of the 2018 NASCAR Camping World Truck Series, the championship race of the season, and the 23rd iteration of the event. The race was held on Friday, November 16, 2018, in Homestead, Florida at Homestead–Miami Speedway, a  permanent oval-shaped racetrack. The race took the scheduled 134 laps to complete. At race's end, Brett Moffitt, driving for underfunded team Hattori Racing Enterprises, dominated the late stages of the race to win his first NASCAR Camping World Truck Series championship. The win was also Moffitt's seventh career NASCAR Camping World Truck Series win and his sixth and final win of the season. To fill out the podium, Grant Enfinger of ThorSport Racing and Noah Gragson of Kyle Busch Motorsports finished second and third, respectively.

Background 

Homestead-Miami Speedway is a motor racing track located in Homestead, Florida. The track, which has several configurations, has promoted several series of racing, including NASCAR, the Verizon IndyCar Series, the Grand-Am Rolex Sports Car Series and the Championship Cup Series.

Since 2002, Homestead-Miami Speedway has hosted the final race of the season in all three of NASCAR's series: the Sprint Cup Series, Xfinity Series and Gander Outdoors Truck Series. Ford Motor Company sponsors all three of the season-ending races; the races have the names Ford EcoBoost 400, Ford EcoBoost 300 and Ford EcoBoost 200, respectively, and the weekend is marketed as Ford Championship Weekend. The Xfinity Series (then known as the Busch Series) has held its season-ending races at Homestead since 1995 and held it until 2020, when it was moved to Phoenix Raceway, along with NASCAR's other two series.

Championship drivers 

 Noah Gragson: Advanced by virtue of points.
 Justin Haley: Advanced by winning the 2018 JAG Metals 350.
 Brett Moffitt: Advanced by winning the 2018 Lucas Oil 150.
 Johnny Sauter: Advanced by winning the 2018 Texas Roadhouse 200.

Entry list 

*Driver changed to Camden Murphy.

**Withdrew due to wrecking in first practice.

Practice

First practice 
The first practice session was held on Friday, November 16, at 8:35 AM EST, and would last for 50 minutes.

Second and final practice 
The second and final practice session, sometimes referred to as Happy Hour, was held on Friday, November 16, at 10:05 AM EST, and would last for 50 minutes.

Qualifying 
Qualifying was held on Friday, November 16, at 3:45 PM EST. Since Homestead–Miami Speedway is at least a 1.5 miles (2.4 km) racetrack, the qualifying system was a single car, single lap, two round system where in the first round, everyone would set a time to determine positions 13–32. Then, the fastest 12 qualifiers would move on to the second round to determine positions 1–12.

No drivers would fail to qualify.

Full qualifying results

Race results 

 Note: Noah Gragson, Justin Haley, Brett Moffitt, and Johnny Sauter are not eligible for stage points because of their participation in the Championship 4.

Stage 1 Laps: 30

Stage 2 Laps: 30

Stage 3 Laps: 74

References 

2018 NASCAR Camping World Truck Series
NASCAR races at Homestead-Miami Speedway
November 2018 sports events in the United States
2018 in sports in Florida